Group G of the 2014 FIFA World Cup consisted of Germany, Portugal, Ghana and United States. Play began on 16 June and ended on 26 June 2014. The top two teams, Germany and the United States, advanced to the round of 16. Germany would go on to win the World Cup.

Teams

Notes

Standings

Germany advanced to play Algeria (runner-up of Group H) in the round of 16.
United States advanced to play Belgium (winner of Group H) in the round of 16.

Matches

Germany vs Portugal

The two teams had met in 17 previous matches, including in the 2006 FIFA World Cup third place match, won by Germany 3–1. Their most recent meeting was in the UEFA Euro 2012 group stage, won by Germany 1–0.

Germany took the lead with a Thomas Müller penalty kick, shooting low and hard into the bottom left-hand corner, awarded after a foul on Mario Götze by João Pereira. Mats Hummels doubled the advantage for Germany by heading in a corner kick from Toni Kroos.
Shortly before halftime Müller and Pepe were involved in an altercation, in which Pepe headbutted Müller and was sent off. In first half stoppage time, Müller intercepted a clearance from Bruno Alves to slot home. Müller completed his hat-trick in the second half, as he scored from close range after Portugal goalkeeper Rui Patrício stopped André Schürrle's cross from the right.

The match was Germany's 100th in the World Cup, the first team to reach the milestone. Müller's hat-trick was the seventh by a German player in the World Cup, the most of any nation. This was Portugal's worst loss in their World Cup history.

Ghana vs United States
The two teams had met in three previous matches, including twice in World Cup in 2006 and 2010, where both times Ghana beat United States 2–1. The 2006 FIFA World Cup encounter was in their last group stage match, and the 2010 FIFA World Cup encounter was in the round of 16 final where Ghana won again, which in both occasions, eliminated United States from those previous World Cups.

Clint Dempsey opened the scoring for the United States within 29 seconds (the fifth fastest goal in the history of the World Cup), as he received the ball from Jermaine Jones, dribbled past John Boye and shot into the far corner. The lead lasted until the 82nd minute, when Asamoah Gyan's back-heel set up André Ayew to score. However, the United States scored the game-winning goal four minutes later, when half-time substitute John Brooks headed in Graham Zusi's corner. The American victory was marred by an injury to Jozy Altidore, leaving the match in the 21st minute with a strained left hamstring.

Dempsey's goal was officially timed by FIFA at 30 seconds after kick-off, the fifth fastest in World Cup history, and the fastest by an American player. He also became the first American player to score in three World Cups. DaMarcus Beasley became the first American to play in four World Cups. Brooks became the first American substitute ever to score in a World Cup.

Germany vs Ghana
The two teams had met in three previous matches, including in the 2010 FIFA World Cup group stage, won by Germany 1–0.

After a goalless first half, Germany took the lead when Thomas Müller crossed from the right for Mario Götze, whose header went in off his thigh. Ghana equalised three minutes later, when André Ayew headed in Harrison Afful's cross from the right. Ghana then took the lead when Sulley Muntari intercepted the ball from Philipp Lahm, then slipped a through ball for Asamoah Gyan to score with his right foot.
Just two minutes after coming on as a substitute, Miroslav Klose once again tied up the match, with a close-range finish after Benedikt Höwedes flicked on a corner from Toni Kroos.

Klose's goal took his World Cup total to 15, equalling the record mark held by Brazil's Ronaldo. He also joined Pelé and Uwe Seeler as the only players to have scored in four World Cups. Gyan became the joint top African scorer in the World Cup (tied with Cameroon's Roger Milla) with five goals, and also the first African player to score in three World Cups. Just as in the 2010 meeting, Jérôme Boateng (Germany) and Kevin-Prince Boateng (Ghana) faced each other, the second time two brothers faced each other in a World Cup game.

In the 52nd minute, a man with a Polish passport, identified as Leszek Ludomir, invaded the pitch shirtless, with letters and numbers painted on his chest and back. FIFA's official TV feed cut out the images. The man was approached in a calm and friendly manner by Ghana midfielder Sulley Muntari, who quickly escorted him off the pitch, and he was then taken into custody by the stadium security. It was also quite surprising that no police were seen on the pitch in pursuit of the invader.

United States vs Portugal
The two teams had met in five previous matches, including in the 2002 FIFA World Cup group stage, won by the United States 3–2. Portugal defender Pepe was suspended for the match after his red card against Germany.

Portugal took the lead within five minutes, when Geoff Cameron's mis-hit clearance fell to Nani and he scored from close range. Near the end of the first half, Nani's long-range shot hit the post, and American goalkeeper Tim Howard saved Éder's follow-up. In the second half, Michael Bradley had a shot cleared off the line by Ricardo Costa, but the United States eventually equalised through Jermaine Jones, as he curled in a right-foot shot in after a corner was cleared to him.
The United States then took the lead, as Graham Zusi crossed for Clint Dempsey to score with his midriff. Had the United States held on for the win, they would have clinched a place in the knockout stage while eliminating Portugal at the same time, but in the fifth minute of injury time, Cristiano Ronaldo crossed for substitute Silvestre Varela to head in the equaliser and keep Portugal's qualification hopes alive.

Varela's goal (94:33) was the latest World Cup goal scored in regulation time. In the 39th minute, the players took a short water break during an injury stoppage, but this was not considered an official "cooling break" as introduced by FIFA for this tournament.

United States vs Germany
The two teams had met in nine previous matches, including twice in the FIFA World Cup, both won by Germany (1998, group stage: 2–0; 2002, quarter-finals: 1–0). The match featured two German coaches, Jürgen Klinsmann and Joachim Löw, facing each other. United States coach Klinsmann played in three World Cups for Germany (he scored the second goal in the 1998 match against the United States), and also managed them in 2006 with Löw as his assistant, who succeeded him after the World Cup.

Both teams came into this match needing only one point to qualify for the knockout stage. The only goal of the match was scored by Thomas Müller in the 55th minute, who slotted in the rebound with his right foot from the edge of the penalty area after American goalkeeper Tim Howard parried out Per Mertesacker's header.
With the win, Germany qualified as group winners, while the United States also qualified despite the loss as Portugal's 2–1 win over Ghana at the same time ensured that the Americans finished as group runners-up above the Portuguese on goal difference, meaning that they reached the knockout stage of consecutive World Cups for the first time. This was the first match of the tournament where Bastian Schweinsteiger was included in the starting lineup and the last match where Lukas Podolski saw any time on the pitch.

With Costa Rica and Mexico also reaching the knockout stage earlier, this was the first time there were three CONCACAF teams in the knockout stage of a World Cup.

Portugal vs Ghana
The two teams had never met before. Ghana midfielder Sulley Muntari was suspended for the match due to accumulation of yellow cards. However, along with fellow midfielder Kevin-Prince Boateng, Muntari was indefinitely suspended from the team for disciplinary reasons by the Ghana Football Association before the match.

Both teams came into the match knowing that to have any chance of qualifying for the knockout stage, they had to win while hoping that the United States vs Germany match, played at the same time, did not end in a draw. Portugal took the lead in the first half, when John Boye deflected in Miguel Veloso's cross with his knee for an own goal. Asamoah Gyan equalised for Ghana in the second half, heading in Kwadwo Asamoah's outside of the foot cross from the left. It was Gyan's sixth goal in World Cups, passing the tally of Roger Milla as the top African goalscorer in the competition. Cristiano Ronaldo scored the winner for Portugal in the 80th minute, after Ghana goalkeeper Fatau Dauda palmed the ball to him in the penalty area after a cross from the left, making Ronaldo the first Portuguese player to score in three World Cups.

Despite the win and Germany's win over the United States, Portugal finished behind the United States on goal difference, and were eliminated together with Ghana, who failed to reach the knockout stage for the first time in their three campaigns.

References

External links
2014 FIFA World Cup Group G, FIFA.com

Group G
Group
Group
Group
group